Michael Cavna is an American writer, artist and cartoonist. He is creator of the "Comic Riffs" column for The Washington Post.

His column has received more than a dozen national awards from the Society for Features Journalism, in 2013, 2014, 2015, 2016, 2017 and 2021.

Career
He graduated from University of California, San Diego.

His "Wise Up" cartoon launched the viral #Draw4Atena campaign in 2015 on behalf of jailed Iranian artist Atena Farghadani.

Cavna wrote the Harvey Award-nominated journalism profile for the Eisner Award-nominated book Team Cul de Sac: Cartoonists Draw the Line at Parkinson's. He was the emcee and co-programmer of the first-ever "Graphic Novel Night" Pavilion at the Library of Congress's National Book Festival.

In February 2015, Cavna began a cartoon that was updated monthly to mark the 545-day detention of American-Iranian journalist Jason Rezaian of The Washington Post; the National Press Club (United States) used the cartoon to raise awareness about Rezaian's case.

Awards
In April 2016, his "Comic Riffs" column was an Eisner Award finalist for journalism.

In April 2017, his "Comic Riffs" columns received a National Headliner Award for lifestyle writing. In May 2017, "Comic Riffs" received a second Eisner Award nomination for journalism. In October 2017, Cavna shared his personal "Peanuts" history in the Eisner Award-winning book Celebrating Snoopy.

In April 2018, Cavna, with narrator/animator Tom Racine, won the Society of Professional Journalists' Sigma Delta Chi Award for his audio/visual storytelling for "For Art's Sake."

In April 2019, his "Comic Riffs" column portfolio of arts writing and illustration received a second National Headliner Award.

In June 2020, his "Comic Riffs" received a third Eisner Award nomination for journalism.

In 2021, Cavna’s cultural coverage received a third National Headliner Award.

References

External links
https://www.washingtonpost.com/people/michael-cavna/

Living people
American cartoonists
American male journalists
American art critics
Place of birth missing (living people)
Year of birth missing (living people)
The Washington Post people
University of California, San Diego alumni